East Nooksack Glacier is in North Cascades National Park in the U.S. state of Washington, on the eastern slopes of Mount Shuksan. East Nooksack Glacier extends from Nooksack Tower to the northwest to Seahpo Peak to the southeast and meltwater from the glacier flows into the Nooksack River.

See also
List of glaciers in the United States

References

Glaciers of the North Cascades
Glaciers of Whatcom County, Washington
Glaciers of Washington (state)